Epipedobates is a genus of poison dart frogs native to northern South America (Colombia and Ecuador) west of the Andes, including the western slopes. Common name phantasmal poison frogs has been suggested for the genus.

Taxonomy
Epipedobates was erected in 1987 in an attempt to split dendrobatids into monophyletic genera, accommodating species that had until then been placed in Phyllobates. In the major revision of poison dart frogs in 2006, most of the species formerly placed in Epipedobates were then transferred to Ameerega, leaving behind just five species. With description of new species, the species count had increased to seven by early 2015.

Description
Dorsal colouration is cryptic, brown. A pale oblique lateral stripe is present. Dorsal skin is smooth or with irregularly scattered granules or tubercles, most distinct and prevalent posteriorly. In adult males, third finger is swollen.

Species
There are seven species:

References

 
Poison dart frogs
Amphibians of South America
Amphibian genera